"Restless Heart" (a.k.a. "Running Away with You (Restless Heart)") is a song by the English singer/musician John Parr, which was released in 1988 as a soundtrack single from the 1987 feature film The Running Man. It was written by Parr and German musician/composer Harold Faltermeyer, and produced by Faltermeyer. The power ballad would later be included on Parr's third studio album Man with a Vision, released in 1992.

Background
"Restless Heart" was intentionally written for The Running Man soundtrack. The song originally used the same title as the film and had a different set of lyrics, but this was changed at the request of the film's producers. Parr told Simon Mayo in 1988, "The lyrics originally went 'Would you bet your life on a running man?', but [the producers] decided it was too close to the film and too downbeat. And they'd got paranoid about the title. Instead, the new version tells the story of what happens when the film finishes."

Parr and Faltermeyer wrote and recorded "Restless Heart" in three days. The pair had previously intended to collaborate on a music project for an unspecified television series, but Parr was unavailable at the time.

Release
"Restless Heart" was played over ending credits of The Running Man, which received its theatrical release in the US on 13 November 1987. With the film's upcoming theatrical release in the UK on 23 September 1988, "Restless Heart" was released as a single from the soundtrack. Parr had hoped "Restless Heart" would re-establish him as a chart act in the UK and allow him to go on tour there, but the song failed to enter the UK Singles Chart. Parr told Mayo in 1988, "People will only come and see you if you've got a hit. If this record takes off, I'll be on the stage as soon as I can."

Promotion
A music video was filmed to promote the single. The scenes featuring Parr were shot in East London by Femme Fatale, while clips from The Running Man were also added to the video.

Critical reception
On its release as a single in the UK, Andrew Hirst of the Huddersfield Daily Examiner praised "Restless Heart" as a "powerful movie anthem" and "far better" than Parr's 1985 hit "St. Elmo's Fire (Man in Motion)". He added, "This release has cut away the bland gristle from American rock to cook up a rare fillet that deserves full Radio One airplay." Barry Young of The Press and Journal gave the single a one out of five star rating and wrote, "Terribly dramatic, with Parr straining to shout out his feelings of deep desire." In 2014, Stephen Daultrey of Louder included the song in his list of "Ten Amazing 80s Action Movie Power Ballads". He described it as "one of the most sincere, embracive tear-rock ballads ever penned", with Parr "croon[ing] with heartfelt purpose".

Track listing
7" single
"Restless Heart" - 4:20
"Crystal Eye" - 3:20

12" and CD single
"Restless Heart (Extended Version)" - 5:51
"Crystal Eye" - 3:25
"Restless Heart (Single Version)" - 4:17

CD Single (German release)
"Restless Heart (Single Version)" - 4:17
"Crystal Eye" - 3:24
"Restless Heart (Extended Version)" - 5:53

Personnel
 John Parr - lead vocals, guitar, producer of "Crystal Eye"
 Harold Faltermeyer - keyboards, producer of "Restless Heart"

References

1987 songs
1988 singles
John Parr songs
Song recordings produced by Harold Faltermeyer
Songs written by Harold Faltermeyer
Songs written by John Parr
CBS Records singles
Rock ballads